First Flight is a public art work by artist Richard Taylor. It is located in front of the Milwaukee Youth Arts Center north of downtown Milwaukee, Wisconsin near 3rd and Walnut Streets. The sculpture is made of aluminum sheets cut and welded and painted white.  The work was commissioned by First Stage to commemorate its 25th anniversary.

References

Aluminum sculptures in Wisconsin
2012 sculptures
Outdoor sculptures in Milwaukee
2012 establishments in Wisconsin